Limpedea may refer to the following rivers in Romania:

 Limpedea, a tributary of the Trebeș in Bacău County
 Limpedea, a tributary of the Băița in Maramureș County
 Limpedea, a tributary of the Berindești in Argeș County
 Limpedea, a tributary of the Izvorul Alb in Suceava County